Útušice is a municipality and village in Plzeň-South District in the Plzeň Region of the Czech Republic. It has about 700 inhabitants.

Administrative parts
The village of Robčice is an administrative part of Útušice.

References

Villages in Plzeň-South District